The 1909 election for Mayor of Los Angeles took place on March 26, 1909 following the recall of incumbent Arthur Cyprian Harper. George Alexander was elected over Fred C. Wheeler by a small plurality. It was the first election "ever held in any American city for the recall of a mayor." It was also the first election held after the charter amendment that instituted nonpartisan elections and made the office of Mayor nonpartisan.

Background 
Facing a recall election, incumbent Democratic mayor Arthur Cyprian Harper was forced to resign due to dishonesty that marked his administration. Because of his resignation, Republican politician William Stephens, who had been picked as Harper's opponent, was named acting mayor of Los Angeles while campaigning was going on, which lasted less than two weeks.

Two candidates participated, Republican candidate George Alexander and Socialist politician Fred C. Wheeler. Wheeler had been denied ballot access because his candidacy had allegedly not followed regulations of the city before the ruling was overturned by a judicial appeal.

Wheeler lost to George Alexander by a small plurality of 1,650 votes, with the Associated Press reporting that the vote for Wheeler was a "was a great surprise".

Results

References and footnotes

External links
 Office of the City Clerk, City of Los Angeles

1909 March
1909 California elections
Los Angeles
1900s in Los Angeles